Dungowan Station is a pastoral lease that operates as a cattle station in the Northern Territory of Australia, approximately  south of Darwin.

Over 13,000 head of cattle graze the property with approximately 5,000 claves being branded each year. It was owned in the 1980s by The Hon Charles Sweeney QC, an Australian pastoralist and  later Chief Justice of Tuvalu, a major interest of whom was water security. He was a relative of Michael and Paul Vandeleur who owned Mataranka Station. 

Approximately  of pastoral country was burnt out by a fire that burnt for over a week. A large portion of Dungowan Station, most of Birrimba Station, some of Murranjai and a little of Killarney Station were burnt out.

The rare and sexually fluid bush tomato Solanum plastisexum ("Dungowan bush tomato") grows nearby.

See also
List of ranches and stations

References

Pastoral leases in the Northern Territory
Stations (Australian agriculture)